"Metanoia" is the special limited edition single release that was originally a b-side on MGMT's debut CD single "Time to Pretend". It was released August 18, 2008,  available in 10" etched vinyl.

"Metanoia" was named "Song of the Day" on September 16, 2008 by Rolling Stone, describing it as a "14-minute opus, which ranges from Donovan-ish acid ballads to interstellar synth-powered dirges to falsetto-laden theater rock."

Track listing

Charts
"Metanoia" peaked at #2 on Billboard's Hot Singles Sales chart in September 2008.

References

External links

2008 singles
MGMT songs
2008 songs
Columbia Records singles
Rock ballads
Songs written by Andrew VanWyngarden
Songs written by Benjamin Goldwasser